Khirbet al-Ward  is a Syrian village located in Markaz Rif Dimashq District, Rif Dimashq. According to the Syria Central Bureau of Statistics (CBS), Khirbet al-Ward had a population of 7,293 in the 2004 census. To its North is Hawsh al-Sultan, and to its south is Al-Horjelah.

References 

Populated places in Markaz Rif Dimashq District